Giordano Trovade (born 23 May 1998) is an Italian football player.

Club career
He made his Serie C debut for Ravenna on 26 September 2018 in a game against Triestina.

On 14 July 2019, he joined Serie C club Südtirol on a one-year contract.

On 24 January 2020, he moved to Bisceglie.

References

External links
 

1998 births
Sportspeople from the Province of Padua
Footballers from Veneto
Living people
Italian footballers
Association football midfielders
Bologna F.C. 1909 players
Mosta F.C. players
Ravenna F.C. players
F.C. Südtirol players
A.S. Bisceglie Calcio 1913 players
Maltese Premier League players
Serie C players
Italian expatriate footballers
Expatriate footballers in Malta